Spilosynema is a genus of spiders in the Thomisidae family. It was first described in 2010 by Tang & Li. , it contains 4 species, all from China.

References

Thomisidae
Araneomorphae genera
Spiders of China